The 1986 Minnesota Senate election was held in the U.S. state of Minnesota on November 4, 1986, to elect members to the Senate of the 75th and 76th Minnesota Legislatures. A primary election was held on September 9, 1986.

The Minnesota Democratic–Farmer–Labor Party (DFL) won a majority of seats, remaining the majority party, followed by the Independent-Republicans of Minnesota. The new Legislature convened on January 6, 1987.

Results

See also
 Minnesota House of Representatives election, 1986
 Minnesota gubernatorial election, 1986

References

1986 Minnesota elections
Minnesota
Minnesota Senate elections